Samuel Watkins Eager (April 8, 1789 – December 23, 1860) was a U.S. representative from New York.

Born in Neelytown, New York, Eager attended Montgomery Academy in Montgomery, New York, and graduated from Princeton College in 1809.
He studied law.
He was admitted to the bar in 1811 and commenced practice in Newburgh, New York.
He moved to Montgomery, New York, in 1826, and continued the practice of his profession.

Eager was elected as an Anti-Jacksonian candidate to the Twenty-first Congress to fill the vacancy caused by the resignation of Hector Craig and served from November 2, 1830, to March 3, 1831.
He was not a candidate at the election held the same day for the Twenty-second Congress.
He returned to Newburgh in 1836 and engaged in literary pursuits.
He died in Newburgh, New York, December 23, 1860.
He was interred in St. George Cemetery.

References

1789 births
1860 deaths
Princeton University alumni
National Republican Party members of the United States House of Representatives from New York (state)
People from Montgomery, New York
19th-century American politicians